Cheyenne Armani Keanu Roma "Chey" Dunkley (born 13 February 1992) is an English professional footballer who plays as a defender for Shrewsbury Town.

Club career

Early career
Born in Wolverhampton, Dunkley joined Crewe Alexandra's youth setup in 2006, aged 14. He made his senior debut while on a work experience loan at Hednesford Town in 2010.

In the 2010 summer, Dunkley was released by Crewe, and joined Hednesford permanently. After two years acting as a starter, he moved to Conference Premier side Kidderminster Harriers in June 2012, with the latter having to pay a £5,000 plus add-ons fee after a dispute in the tribunal was held.

Oxford United
On 20 November 2014 Dunkley joined Oxford United on loan until the end of the season, with Sam Long moving in the opposite direction, and joined The Us permanently in January for an undisclosed fee. He made his professional debut on 20 December 2014, coming on as a 31st-minute substitute in a 1–1 away draw against Hartlepool United. He scored his first goal in a 4–1 away victory in League Two over Exeter City on 23 February 2016. In April 2016 the "unfortunate" Dunkley scored an own goal in the final of the Football League Trophy against Barnsley at Wembley Stadium, a match which Barnsley won 3–2. On 7 May 2016, Dunkley scored the first goal in the final game of the 2015–16 season against Wycombe Wanderers, a game which United won 3–0 to secure promotion to League One.

Wigan Athletic
On 5 June 2017 it was announced that Dunkley would join Wigan Athletic at the end of his Oxford United contract.

Sheffield Wednesday
On 13 August 2020 it was announced that Dunkley would join Sheffield Wednesday as their second signing of the summer on a two-year deal. He would eventually make his debut almost 4 months after joining the club in a 2-1 defeat against Barnsley on 12 December 2020. He was awarded the clubs player for the month for December, the first month after breaking into the team. His first goal for the club was an equaliser against Cheltenham Town on 30 October 2021. The following month would see a great turn of form, scoring again, against Accrington Stanley and being a constant threat in both boxes, as well as winning the clubs player of the month for November. On 21 May 2022, it was announced he would be released following the end of the season.

Shrewsbury Town
On 28 June 2022, Dunkley agreed to join Shrewsbury Town on a two-year deal.

International career
In June 2021, Dunkley received an invite to play for the Jamaica national side for the CONCACAF Gold Cup in July 2021.

Career statistics

Honours
Oxford United
League Two runner-up: 2015–16
EFL Trophy runner-up: 2015–16, 2016–17

Wigan Athletic
League One: 2017–18

References

External links

1992 births
Living people
Footballers from Wolverhampton
English footballers
English people of Jamaican descent
Association football defenders
Crewe Alexandra F.C. players
Hednesford Town F.C. players
Kidderminster Harriers F.C. players
Oxford United F.C. players
Wigan Athletic F.C. players
Sheffield Wednesday F.C. players
Shrewsbury Town F.C. players
National League (English football) players
English Football League players
England semi-pro international footballers